Simone Branca (born 25 March 1992) is an Italian football player. He plays for Cittadella. Besides Italy, he has played in Denmark.

Club career
He is the product of Novara youth teams. He made a couple of bench appearances for Novara's senior squad in 2011–12 Serie A, but did not see any field time.

Before the 2012–13 season he joined Serie C club Südtirol on loan. He made his Serie C debut for Südtirol on 2 September 2012 in a game against AlbinoLeffe as a starter. Before the next season, he dissolved his Novara contract by mutual consent and rejoined Südtirol on a permanent basis.

On 30 June 2015 Branca signed a three-year contract with another Serie C club Alessandria.

On 26 January 2018, he moved to Denmark, signing with Vejle in the second-tier Danish 1st Division. He reunited with the Italian manager Adolfo Sormani, who previously coached Branca at Südtirol. He became the first Italian to play for Vejle. He contributed to Vejle getting promotion back to Danish Superliga.

On 6 July 2018, he returned to Italy, signing with Serie B club Cittadella.

Career statistics

References

External links
 

1992 births
People from Busto Arsizio
Footballers from Lombardy
Living people
Italian footballers
Association football midfielders
Novara F.C. players
F.C. Südtirol players
U.S. Alessandria Calcio 1912 players
Vejle Boldklub players
A.S. Cittadella players
Serie B players
Serie C players
Danish 1st Division players
Italian expatriate footballers
Expatriate men's footballers in Denmark
Sportspeople from the Province of Varese